"Telluride" is a song originally recorded by Tim McGraw on his 2001 album Set This Circus Down. McGraw's version, though never a single, charted twice on Hot Country Songs as an album cut. It reached No. 52 on its first entry, and then re-entered at No. 59 in 2002.

It was later recorded by American country music artist Josh Gracin.  It was released in December 2008 as the fifth single from the album We Weren't Crazy.  The song reached #34 on the Billboard Hot Country Songs chart.  The song was written by Brett James and Troy Verges.

Chart performance

Tim McGraw version

Josh Gracin version

References

2008 singles
2001 songs
Tim McGraw songs
Josh Gracin songs
Songs written by Brett James
Songs written by Troy Verges
Song recordings produced by Brett James
Lyric Street Records singles